Ihor Yevhenovych Korol (born 26 August 1971) is a Ukrainian football coach and a former player. He manages the under-19 team of FC Metalurh Donetsk.

He is a son of former Soviet player Yevhen Korol.

References

1971 births
Sportspeople from Donetsk
Living people
Ukrainian footballers
FC Khartsyzk players
FC Nyva Ternopil players
Ukrainian Premier League players
FC Metalurh Donetsk players
FC Baltika Kaliningrad players
Ukrainian expatriate footballers
Expatriate footballers in Russia
Russian Premier League players
FC Podillya Khmelnytskyi players
FC Nyva Vinnytsia players
FC Monolit Kostiantynivka players
FC Spartak Ivano-Frankivsk players
Ukrainian football managers
Association football defenders